Marvin Gaye: Live in Montreux 1980 is a taped performance of singer Marvin Gaye's performance at the Montreux Jazz Festival, recorded on July 17, 1980. Gaye included this performance as part of a European tour. Gaye performs a majority of his hits from his recent disco-funk hits "Got to Give It Up" and "A Funky Space Reincarnation", to his duet hits with Tammi Terrell including "Ain't No Mountain High Enough" and "Ain't Nothing Like the Real Thing", in which Gaye re-interpolated the songs as a somber tribute to Terrell, who died over a decade before, to sixties Motown classics such as "I'll Be Doggone", "Ain't That Peculiar", "How Sweet It Is (To Be Loved By You)" and "I Heard It through the Grapevine", to seventies standards such as "What's Going On", "Trouble Man" and "Let's Get It On". The Montreux set was later released as a CD/DVD in 2003.

Track listing

Main tracks
"Time to Get It Together (overture/introduction)"
"Got to Give It Up"
"A Funky Space Reincarnation"
"After the Dance (Hellos)"
"Come Get to This"
"Let's Get It On"
"After the Dance"
"Tammi Terrell medley: "If This World Were Mine"/"Ain't Nothing Like the Real Thing"/"Ain't No Mountain High Enough"
"How Sweet It Is (To Be Loved By You)"
"Ain't That Peculiar"
"I'll Be Doggone"
"I Heard It through the Grapevine"
"Trouble Man"
"Distant Lover"
"Inner City Blues (Make Me Wanna Holler)"
"Mercy Mercy Me (The Ecology)"
"What's Going On"

Personnel
Adapted from DVD liner notes
Marvin Gaye Jr. - Vocals
Reginald Mullen - Trumpet
Rick Gardner - Trumpet
Kush Griffitt - Trumpet, Horn Arrangement
David Majai Li - Saxophone
Gordon Banks - Lead Guitar
Howard Westbrook - Rhythm Guitar
Frank Blair - Bass Guitar
William "Snoopy" Bryant II - Piano
Lonnie Smith - Keyboards
Sandra Akaka - Congas
Joseph Mayo - Congas
Checo Tohomaso - Percussion
Preston McRae Wilcox - Drums
Lecester Kentel - Vocals
Frankie Bates - Vocals
Robert Stevenson - Vocals

References

Marvin Gaye video albums
2003 live albums
2003 video albums
Live video albums
Marvin Gaye live albums